Mahki (also Romanized as Mahkī) is a village in Rumeshkhan Rural District, Central District, Rumeshkhan County, Lorestan Province, Iran.  It lies about a kilometer south-west of the village of Choqapur Aliabad. At the 2006 census, its population was 1,205, in 223 families.

References 

Populated places in Rumeshkhan County